The Torre de la Libertad is a monument located in the city of Bata in the continental region of the African country of Equatorial Guinea. It was inaugurated on October 12 of 2011 in the celebrations for the independence of the nation. The structure consists of a tower with a promenade that changes colors at night due to a lighting system. Among other attractions is a revolving restaurant, which is located at the top.

References 

Buildings and structures in Bata, Equatorial Guinea
Skyscrapers in Equatorial Guinea
Tourist attractions in Equatorial Guinea
Towers completed in 2011